San Diego is one of the major cities in California. The following is a list of media outlets based in the city of San Diego. People in San Diego are also able to receive media from Tijuana, Mexico.

Print

Newspapers
 The San Diego Union-Tribune is the city's primary newspaper, published daily. The Union-Tribune was formed in 1992 through a merger of the San Diego Union (established 1868) and the San Diego Evening Tribune (established 1881). The newspapers hald been under common ownership since 1901. The Evening-Tribune was the evening paper, while the Union was the morning paper; the Union-Tribune is a morning paper. As of 2015, the Union-Tribune had won four Pulitzer Prizes and was the oldest company in continuous operation in San Diego. In 2015, Tribune Publishing, which operates the Los Angeles Times and other major U.S. daily newspapers, purchased the newspaper in an $85 million deal. The purchase ended 146 years of private local ownership for the paper.

Other papers and news outlets published in the city include:

 La Prensa San Diego
 San Diego Daily Transcript
 San Diego City Beat
 The San Diego Reader is the largest alternative weekly in the city. Founded in 1972, the paper was headquartered in Little Italy before moving to Golden Hill in 2012.
 San Diego Business Journal
 The Southern Cross, the newspaper of the Roman Catholic Diocese of San Diego

Neighborhood newspapers include:
Beach & Bay Press (Pacific Beach, Mission Beach and Mission Bay), published every other week
Carmel Valley News
The Clairemont Times
The Coronado Times Newspaper
La Jolla Light
La Jolla Village News, published every other week
Mission Times Courier
Peninsula Beacon (Ocean Beach and Point Loma), published every other week
Presidio Sentinel
Rancho Bernardo News Journal
San Diego Downtown News, published monthly
San Diego Uptown News (Bankers Hill, Balboa Park, Golden Hill, Hillcrest, Kensington, Mission Hills, Normal Heights, North Park, Old Town, South Park, Talmadge, University Heights), published monthly

Magazines
Magazines published in San Diego include:
 Edible San Diego
 Ranch & Coast
 San Diego Family
 San Diego Magazine
 San Diego Troubadour

Online
Online-only media in San Diego include:
 Fresh Brewed Tech, a local tech news website
 Patch, a national network of local news sites, operates in San Diego
 San Diego Story, an arts review website
 The Times of San Diego is a Web-based news outlet founded in 2014 that features local news daily for the city and surrounding area. It has earned acclaim as a small business with a booming readership. Currently the site reaches over 1 million unique users every month, according to its published reports. The audience is young, with readers aged 18 to 44 constituting the largest segment. Nearly 60 percent of reading sessions are from Southern California. At the height of the COVID-19 pandemic in April 2020, the site reported 1.53 million unique users. Times of San Diego differs from other recent local-media startups in providing full daily coverage of news in a large metro area, rather than infrequent in-depth articles. It differs in this regard from Voice of San Diego, a 15-year-old startup, and has passed that website in audience size. Times of San Diego's contributing editors have been featured on local radio programs and have led training sessions for local journalists. Times of San Diego has been named "best news site" four years in row by the San Diego Press Club, and the site's editors took home 23 other awards in 2019. The site received a grant from Google in June 2020 to expand coverage of the local impact of the COVID-19 pandemic.
 Voice of San Diego (Voiceofsandiego.org) is a non-profit news outlet in San Diego that reports on the city. A Web-only local outlet, Voice of San Diego was founded in 2005, it was one of a number of such publications that emerged around that time in responsive to cutbacks in traditional local print newspapers. The site is known for both its news coverage and local investigative reporting. The website is partially funded by grants, but is financed primarily on a paid membership model. In 2016, Voice of San Diego launched the News Revenue Hub, a pilot project aimed at helping other nonprofit news organizations adopt its model. Members of the pilot include Honolulu Civil Beat, InsideClimate News, The Lens, and New Jersey Spotlight. It has won a variety of local journalism awards from the San Diego chapter of the Society of Professional Journalists (for reports exposing corruption at the San Diego Unified School District) and from the San Diego Press Club.
inewsource, a nonprofit newsroom
Vanguard Culture, a nonprofit arts and culture website
Water News Network, a specialized newsroom operated by the San Diego County Water Authority.

Radio
San Diego is a principal city of the San Diego radio market. In its Fall 2013 ranking of radio markets by population, Arbitron ranked the San Diego market 17th in the United States. The market only covers San Diego County.

The following is a list of radio stations which broadcast from and/or are licensed to San Diego:

AM

FM

Television
The San Diego television market only includes San Diego County. The city is the headquarters of the privately held Herring Networks, which owns the AWE Network and One America News Network cable channels.

The following is a list of television stations that broadcast from and/or are licensed to San Diego.

References

Mass media in California

San Diego